Hendrik Laurentius "Hans" s'Jacob  (5 April 1906, Driebergen - 29 March 1967, Leiden) was a Dutch politician.

1906 births
1967 deaths
Ministers of War of the Netherlands
People from Driebergen-Rijsenburg